The Milan metropolitan area, also known as Grande Milano ("Greater Milan"), is the largest metropolitan area in Italy and the 54th largest in the world. It is the largest transnational metropolitan area in the EU. The metropolitan area described in this article is strictly statistical and, contrary to the administrative Metropolitan City of Milan, a provincial-level municipality, does not imply any kind of administrative unity or function.

Definition 

Given the absence of an official statistical definition for the metropolitan area of Milan, tracing precise boundaries is a somewhat slippery issue. However, during the last decade, a number of studies have been carried out on the subject by some authoritative institutions and scholars, notably the Organisation for Economic Co-operation and Development and numerous Italian sources that build a definition based on commuting fluxes and on the concentration of commercial, leisure and public utility services. A broad consensus exists upon a definition that includes the central Lombard provinces of Milan, Bergamo, Como, Lecco, Lodi, Monza and Brianza, Pavia, Varese and the Piedmontese Province of Novara, while some scholars include also the Province of Cremona and Brescia in Lombardy, the Piemontese Province of Alessandria and the Emilian Province of Piacenza.

Largest cities 

The following is a list of the twenty largest cities in the Milan metropolitan area as ranked by population.

See also 
Transport in Milan
List of metropolitan areas in Europe
 Metropolitan City of Milan
 Province of Milan

References 

Metropolitan areas of Italy

Geographical, historical and cultural regions of Italy